Ároktő is a village in Borsod-Abaúj-Zemplén county, Hungary. The village is located on the banks of the Tisza river.

External links 
 Street map 

Populated places in Borsod-Abaúj-Zemplén County